Konstantinos "Kostas" Mourouzis (May 10, 1934 to June 11, 2014), also known as Dinos Mourouzis, was a Greek professional basketball player and coach. His nickname was, "The Fox of the Bench".

Playing career

Club career
Mourouzis started playing youth club basketball in Greece, with the youth clubs of Triton, in 1945, and made the club's men's senior team in 1948. He also played in the top-tier level Italian League, with Sporting Club Gira Bologna, in the mid to late 1950s.

National team career
Mourouzis played with the senior Greek national basketball team in 24 games, averaging 10.1 points per game. With Greece, he won the bronze medal at the 1955 Mediterranean Games. He also played at the 1960 Pre-Olympic Tournament, and the EuroBasket 1961.

Coaching career

Clubs
Mourouzis began working as a basketball coach in 1959, with the Greek club Triton. As the head coach of the Greek Basket League club Panathinaikos, he won 6 Greek League championships (1967, 1969, 1971, 1972, 1973, 1974). He also led Panathinaikos to the semifinals of the European-wide second-tier level FIBA Cup Winners Cup (later called FIBA Saporta Cup), in the 1968–69 season, and to the semifinals of the European-wide top-tier level FIBA European Champions Cup (later called EuroLeague), in the 1971–72 season.

After coaching AEK Athens, he moved to Olympiacos. With Olympiacos, he won the Greek Cup title in 1977, and both the Greek League championship and the Greek Cup title in 1978. In the 1978–79 season, he led Olympiacos to a 6th-place finish in the FIBA European Champions Cup (EuroLeague).

Greek national team
Mourouzis was also the head coach of the senior Greek national basketball team. He was Greece's head coach at the 1973 EuroBasket.

Personal life
Mourouzis died in Athens, Greece, on June 11, 2014.

References

External links
 FIBA Player Profile
 Hellenic Federation Player Profile 
 A special game for Kostas Mourouzis
 Kostas Mourouzis
 The top of the Greek bench: Kostas Mourouzis 

1934 births
2014 deaths
AEK B.C. coaches
Greek basketball coaches
Greek men's basketball players
Greek Basket League players
Olympiacos B.C. coaches
Panathinaikos B.C. coaches
Basketball players from Athens
Mediterranean Games bronze medalists for Greece
Mediterranean Games medalists in basketball
Basketball players at the 1955 Mediterranean Games